The year 2023 is the 6th year in the history of the Bare Knuckle Fighting Championship, a bare-knuckle fighting promotion based in Philadelphia.

Background 
2023 season is expected to start with Bare Knuckle Fighting Championship 35 on January 27, 2023. BKFC is available on PPV all over the world and on FITE TV.

List of events

Bare Knuckle Fighting Championship 35: Cedeno vs. Slaveski

Bare Knuckle Fighting Championship 35: Cedeno vs. Slaveski was a bare-knuckle fighting event held by Bare Knuckle Fighting Championship on January 27, 2023, at the John T. Rhodes Sports Center in Myrtle Beach, South Carolina, USA.

Background
The event featured a welterweight title eliminator bout between Yosdenis Cedeno and Gorjan Slaveski.

The event was expected to have a rematch between BKFC Bantamweight Champion Johnny Bedford and former champion Dat Nguyen; however, the bout was cancelled after Bedford retired from combat sports just a few days into the camp.

Results

Bare Knuckle Fighting Championship: KnuckleMania 3 

Bare Knuckle Fighting Championship: KnuckleMania 3 was a bare-knuckle fighting event held by Bare Knuckle Fighting Championship on February 17, 2023, at the Tingley Coliseum in Albuquerque, New Mexico, USA.

Background
The event was headlined by the BKFC Light Heavyweight Championship unification bout between the reigning champion Lorenzo Hunt and the interim champion Mike Richman

The event also featured the bare-knuckle debut of former WBA (Regular) Light Middleweight champion Austin Trout as he faced UFC Hall of Famer Diego Sanchez.

Also, former NFL defensive end and mixed martial artist Greg Hardy made his bare-knuckle debut on the card against Josh Watson. Additionally, the Albuquerque native, The Ultimate Fighter 14 winner and two-time UFC title challenger John Dodson and his brother Eric appeared on the card.

Results

Bare Knuckle Fighting Championship 36: Adams vs. Belcher

Bare Knuckle Fighting Championship 36: Adams vs. Belcher was a bare-knuckle fighting event held by Bare Knuckle Fighting Championship on February 24, 2023, at the Pontchartrain Center in Kenner, Louisiana, USA.

Background
The event was headlined by the heavyweight contender Alan Belcher challenging the reigning champion Arnold Adams.

Results

Bare Knuckle Fighting Championship 37: Tierney vs. Lindsey

Bare Knuckle Fighting Championship 37: Tierney vs. Lindsey was a bare-knuckle fighting event held by Bare Knuckle Fighting Championship on March 4, 2023, at the Crystal Palace National Sports Centre in London, England.

Background
The event was headlined by a bout between Connor Tierney and Jake Lindsey.

Results

Bare Knuckle Fighting Championship 38: Buakaw vs. Saenchai (cancelled)

Bare Knuckle Fighting Championship 38: Buakaw vs. Saenchai was scheduled to be a bare-knuckle fighting event held by Bare Knuckle Fighting Championship on March 18, 2023.

Background
The event was scheduled to be headlined by a special rules bare-knuckle Muay Thai bout between Muay Thai legends Buakaw Banchamek and Saenchai. However, In mid-February it was announced that due to legal implications regarding the use of name muay thai in marketing, the bout was indefinitely postponed. Being the only published bout, the event was removed from the organization's event schedule altogether.

Results

Bare Knuckle Fighting Championship: Delray Beach

Bare Knuckle Fighting Championship: Nguyen vs. Straus will be a bare-knuckle fighting event held by Bare Knuckle Fighting Championship on April 21, 2023. The event was initially scheduled to take place on March 17, but due to undisclosed reasons it was postponed on the day of the event.

Results

Bare Knuckle Fighting Championship 39: Barnett vs. Cedermalm

Bare Knuckle Fighting Championship 39: Norfolk will be a bare-knuckle fighting event held by Bare Knuckle Fighting Championship on March 24, 2023.

Results

Bare Knuckle Fighting Championship 40: Brito vs. Cox

Bare Knuckle Fighting Championship 40: Brito vs. Cox will be a bare-knuckle fighting event held by Bare Knuckle Fighting Championship on April 22, 2023.

Results

Bare Knuckle Fighting Championship 41: Colorado

Bare Knuckle Fighting Championship 41: Colorado will be a bare-knuckle fighting event held by Bare Knuckle Fighting Championship on April 29, 2023.

Results

Bare Knuckle Fighting Championship 42: Greenville

Bare Knuckle Fighting Championship 42: Greenville will be a bare-knuckle fighting event held by Bare Knuckle Fighting Championship on May 12, 2023.

Results

See also 
Bare Knuckle Fighting Championship

References

External links
 Bare Knuckle Official Website

Bare Knuckle Fighting Championship
2023 in boxing
2023 sport-related lists